Knight of the Black Rose is the second novel in the Ravenloft books gothic horror series. Written by James Lowder, it is set both in Krynn and more prominently, the Demiplane of Dread, location of the Ravenloft campaign setting.

Plot summary
On the fabled world of Krynn, Lord Soth finally learns that there is a price to pay for his long history of evil deeds, a price even an undead warrior might find horrifying. Dark powers transport Soth to Barovia, and there the death knight must face the dread minions of Count Strahd Von Zarovich, the vampire lord of the nightmare land. But with only a captive Vistani woman and an untrustworthy ghost for allies, Lord Soth soon discovers that he may have to join forces with the powerful vampire if he is ever to escape the realm of terror. Knight of the Black Rose is the second in an open-ended series of Gothic horror tales dealing with the masters and monsters of the Ravenloft dark fantasy setting.

Reception

Reviews
Magia i Miecz #54 (June 1998) (Polish)
Kliatt
Science Fiction Chronicle

References

1991 American novels
Ravenloft novels